Robert, Rob or Bob Knight may refer to:

Politics
Robert Knight, 1st Earl of Catherlough (1702–1772), Earl of Catherlough and MP for Great Grimsby, Milborne Port and Castle Rising
Robert Knight (MP, born 1768) (1768–1855), Member of Parliament (MP) for Wootton Bassett, for Rye, and for Wallingford
Robert G. Knight (born 1941), former mayor of Wichita, Kansas
Rob Knight (politician) (born 1967), Australian politician
Robert Knight or Roy Knight (1891–1971), member of the Canadian House of Commons

Science
Robert P. Knight (1902–1966), American psychoanalyst
Robert T. Knight, American neurologist
Bob Knight (psychologist) (born 1950), American psychologist
Rob Knight (biologist) (born 1976), American biologist

Sports
Robert Knight (cricketer, born 1858) (1858–1938), Welsh cricketer and barrister
Robert Knight (cricketer, born 1879) (1879–1955), English cricketer
Robert Knight (cricketer, born 1957), Australian cricketer
Bob Knight (born 1940), American college basketball coach
Bob Knight (basketball, born 1929) (1929–2008), American professional basketball player

Others
Robert Knight (editor) (1825–1890), founding editor of The Times of India and The Statesman
Robert Knight (industrialist) (1826–1912), Rhode Island manufacturer, founder of Fruit of the Loom
Robert Knight (musician) (1945–2017), American singer
Robert Knight (trade unionist) (1833–1911), British leader of the Boilermakers trade union
Robert H. Knight (born 1951), conservative activist
Robert K. Knight, college president
Robert M. Knight, photographer
Robert Knight (journalist) (1949–2014), American radio journalist (see List of George Polk Award winners)

See also
Robert Knights (born 1941), director